The Aaron Wheeler House is a historic colonial house located at 371 Fairview Avenue in Rehoboth, Massachusetts.

Description and history 
The two-story gambrel-roofed wood-frame house was built c. 1745, and is one of the town's best-preserved examples of the style. It is also notable for its detailed deed history, which is also rare in Rehoboth. Aaron Wheeler, its builder, was a farmer, part owner of local industrial sites, and was an active participant in the American Revolutionary War.

The house was listed on the National Register of Historic Places on June 6, 1983.

See also
National Register of Historic Places listings in Bristol County, Massachusetts

References

Houses completed in 1745
Houses on the National Register of Historic Places in Bristol County, Massachusetts
Houses in Bristol County, Massachusetts
Buildings and structures in Rehoboth, Massachusetts
1745 establishments in Massachusetts
Colonial architecture in Massachusetts
Georgian architecture in Massachusetts